Wang Yanzhang (born 31 May 1991) is a Paralympian athlete from China competing mainly in F34 classification throwing events.

Athletics career
Wang represented China at the 2012 Summer Paralympics in London, entering the shot put, javelin throw and discus throw events. He finished eighth in the shot put, but finished on the podium in both the javelin and discus, winning silver and gold respectively. As well as his Paralympic success Wang has won medals at the World Championships winning two silvers at the 2013 Games in Lyon, and in the 2015 Games in Doha he won gold in both the javelin and discus.

Personal history
Wang was born in Shanghai, China in 1991. He has cerebral palsy.

Notes

Paralympic athletes of China
Athletes (track and field) at the 2008 Summer Paralympics
Athletes (track and field) at the 2012 Summer Paralympics
Athletes (track and field) at the 2016 Summer Paralympics
Paralympic gold medalists for China
Paralympic silver medalists for China
Living people
1991 births
Medalists at the 2012 Summer Paralympics
Chinese male discus throwers
Chinese male javelin throwers
Chinese male shot putters
Sportspeople from Shanghai
Paralympic medalists in athletics (track and field)
World Para Athletics Championships winners
Athletes (track and field) at the 2020 Summer Paralympics
21st-century Chinese people